Nazir Nabaa (born 1938 in Damascus, Syria) was a Syrian painter. Considered a pioneer of modern Syrian art, he studied art at the College of Fine Arts in Cairo in Cairo from 1959 to 1965 during the time of the United Arab Republic. He continued his training at École nationale supérieure des Beaux-Arts in Paris from 1971 to 1974. After completing his studies he returned to Damascus and joined the faculty of the College of Fine Arts at Damascus University. Nabaa's style is noted for blending together ancient visual culture with modern themes, and his work has been shown in exhibitions at museums such as the Jordan National Gallery of Fine Arts.

Awards
 1968: Judges Panel's Award; Biennial; Alexandria.
 1979: Diploma, Bratislava International Exhibition, Children drawing and painting.
 Ecole Supérieure des Beaux-Arts, special award, for "works leading to graduation."
 1995: Judges Panel's Award, Cairo International Biennial.

References 

1938 births
Syrian painters
People from Damascus
Syrian male artists
Syrian artists
2016 deaths